NGC 249 is an emission nebula in the constellation Tucana. It was discovered on 5 September 1826 by the astronomer James Dunlop.

See also 
List of NGC objects

References

External links 
 

Tucana (constellation)
0249
Emission nebulae
18260905